Volica is a village and municipality in the Medzilaborce District in the Prešov Region of far north-eastern Slovakia, in the Laborec Highlands.

History
In historical records the village was first mentioned in 1405. 
The name of the village is derived from vôl, vol, "ox", and reflected in its coat of arms.

Geography

The municipality lies at an altitude of 254 metres and covers an area of 5.373 km². It has a population of about 328 people.

Gallery

References

External links
 
 
https://web.archive.org/web/20080111223415/http://www.statistics.sk/mosmis/eng/run.html 

Villages and municipalities in Medzilaborce District